Donald R. Toussaint (May 21, 1927 – January 1986) was appointed by President Jimmy Carter as United States ambassador to Sri Lanka and the Maldives, and served from 21 January 1980 to 7 January 1982.

He was born in Oakland, California and got his PhD from Stanford University.  He joined the Foreign Service in 1956 and was posted in Indonesia, the United Nations, and Iran.  He was Deputy Assistant Secretary of State for International Organization Affairs from 1976 to 1977 and deputy coordination of the U.N. Conference on Science and Technology from 1977 to 1978.

References

 Public Papers of the President of the United States: Jimmy Carter, 1979-, by Frank Thompson

1927 births
1986 deaths
Ambassadors of the United States to Sri Lanka
Ambassadors of the United States to the Maldives
People from Oakland, California
Stanford University alumni
United States Foreign Service personnel
20th-century American diplomats